Polish composer Krzysztof Penderecki wrote his Symphony No. 2 during the winter of 1979–80. Sometimes referred to as the "Christmas Symphony" (the opening phrase from the Christmas carol "Silent Night" occurs three times during the symphony), neither the score nor the parts (Schott Music, Mainz 45 791) make any reference to this moniker.

Structure
The symphony, lasting 30–35 minutes, is in one movement employing a modified sonata form. Sections are marked: Moderato, Allegretto, Lento, Tempo I and Allegretto.

Instrumentation
Piccolo, flutes (2), oboes (2), cor anglais, clarinets (3 in E flat, with bass clarinets), bassoons (2), contrabassoon, horns (5), trumpets (3),  trombones (3), tubas (1), percussion (4 performers: triangle, gong, beck., tamtam, mil. tr., gr. tr., tubular bells, glockenspiel, xylophone), celesta, strings.

Premiere
The New York Philharmonic, conducted by Zubin Mehta, gave the first performance of the symphony on 1 May 1980.

Recordings

References

Symphonies by Krzysztof Penderecki
1980 compositions